The Hydrogen link network in  Denmark was established in 2005 by the Nordic Transportpolitical Network to form a hydrogen highway with hydrogen Sweden and hynor as part of the Scandinavian hydrogen highway partnership.

The planned highway is part of the hydrogen infrastructure. Two hydrogen re-fueling stations are open for public use in Denmark, and four more are planned, .

Two hydrogen vehicles, the Hyundai ix35 FCEV and Toyota Mirai, have been announced for public distribution in 2015, but only a few dozen are expected to be sold or leased in Europe in 2015.

Public stations

Closed stations
Århus - methanol reforming (steam reforming) and industrial H2.
Fredericia - Biofuel reforming of methanol (steam reforming).
Hobro - Natural gas reforming (steam reforming) and industrial H2
Padborg - natural gas reforming (steam reforming). Electrolysis on-site.
Ringkobing - Wind electrolysis.
Sydthy - Wind electrolysis

See also
Hydrogen economy

References

External links
Hydrogen link
Network

Hydrogen infrastructure
Road transport in Denmark